Luiz Cesar Barbieri (born 11 July 1981 in São Paulo, Brazil), known as Cesinha, is a professional football striker who currently plays for Windsor Arch Ka I of the Macau 1st Division Football.

Cesinha became the Macau Footballer of the Year in 2012.

References

External links
 Cesinha at playmakerstats.com (formerly thefinalball.com)

1981 births
Living people
Brazilian footballers
Footballers from São Paulo
Association football forwards
F.C. Barreirense players
G.D. Estoril Praia players
Gil Vicente F.C. players
Windsor Arch Ka I players
Olympiakos Nicosia players